Paul Pottier (born 11 April 1956) is a Canadian water polo player. He competed at the 1976 Summer Olympics and the 1984 Summer Olympics.

References

External links
 

1956 births
Living people
Canadian male water polo players
Olympic water polo players of Canada
Water polo players at the 1976 Summer Olympics
Water polo players at the 1984 Summer Olympics
Sportspeople from Hamilton, Ontario